Jan Kraus may refer to:

 Jan Kraus (actor) (born 1953), Czech actor and TV host
 Jan Kraus (footballer) (born 1979), Czech footballer
 Jan Kraus (wrestler), Czech wrestler
 Jan Kraus (cyclist) (born 1993), Czech track cyclist